Tephritis quasiprolixa is a species of tephritid or fruit flies in the genus Tephritis of the family Tephritidae.

Distribution
 Australia

References

Tephritinae
Insects described in 1996
Diptera of Australasia